Controllo del livello di rombo is a double live album by Italian rock band Subsonica. It also contains three studio tracks: "L'Errore", "Livido Amniotico" and "Non Chiedermi Niente".

Track listing

Disc one
L'Errore
Radiopatchanka
Nuvole Rapide
Albascura
Colpo Di Pistola
Gente Tranquilla (featuring Rachid)
Perfezione
Velociraptor
Come Se
Il Cielo Su Torino
Tutti I Miei Sbagli
Livido Amniotico (featuring Veronika Coassolo)

Disc two
Non Chiedermi Niente
Eva-Eva
Discolabirinto
Nuova Ossessione
Mammifero
Depre
Strade
Ain't No Sunshine
Istantanee
Aurora Sogna
Liberi Tutti
Sole Silenzioso

2003 live albums
Subsonica albums
Italian-language albums